Sunshine Farm and Gardens (60 acres) is an Arboretum, Botanic Garden, garden center, retail and wholesale nursery located at  altitude near Falling Spring / Renick, Greenbrier County West Virginia. The public is welcome to tour the gardens with prior reservation. Reservations can be made by calling 304-497-2208

The gardens contain over 10,000 different varieties of perennials, bulbs, trees and shrubs. The other main focus is on the cultivation and propagation of east coast native plants with several acres dedicated to woodland perennials and wildflowers.

See also 
 List of botanical gardens and arboretums in West Virginia

External links 
 Sunshine Farm and Gardens

Botanical gardens in West Virginia
Farms in West Virginia
Tourist attractions in Greenbrier County, West Virginia